Brachyvalva is a genus of moths belonging to the subfamily Tortricinae of the family Tortricidae.

Species
Brachyvalva inoffensa Diakonoff, 1960

See also
List of Tortricidae genera

References

External links
 tortricidae.com

Archipini
Tortricidae genera
Taxa named by Alexey Diakonoff